Devils Lake is a small lake in Lincoln County, Oregon, United States, along the Oregon Coast. It separates the northern part of Lincoln City from the Central Oregon Coast Range. The D River flows from the lake westward to the Pacific Ocean. At , it is one of the world's shortest rivers, but  for a definition of river that excludes estuaries .

According to Oregon Geographic Names, the name derives from a Native American legend. In the legend, a giant fish, giant octopus, or other large marine creature would occasionally surface, much to the dismay of anyone fishing in the vicinity.

The lake is managed by the Devils Lake Water Improvement District. The Preservation Association of Devils Lake (PADL) was founded in 1982. According to the organization's website, its mission is:
To correct, protect and preserve the water resources and other natural assets of Devils Lake from misuse and pollution. To encourage the improvement of the overall environmental and economic use of the lake as a recreational, scenic asset for all time to the entire Lincoln City area.

See also
 Devils Lake State Recreation Area, a state park on the south shore of the lake
 Devils Lake (Deschutes County, Oregon)
 D River State Recreation Site, a state park along the D River
 List of lakes in Oregon

References

External links
 Preservation Association of Devils Lake
 Devils Lake Water Improvement District

Oregon Coast
Lakes of Oregon
Lincoln City, Oregon
Lakes of Lincoln County, Oregon